Charles Burton Barber (1845–1894) was a British painter who attained great success with his paintings of children and their pets.

Barber was born in Great Yarmouth in Norfolk, and studied from the age of 18 at the Royal Academy, London - receiving a silver medal for drawing in 1864, and first exhibiting there in 1866.

During his lifetime Barber was regarded as one of Britain's finest animal painters and received commissions from Queen Victoria to do paintings of her with grandchildren and dogs, and also the Prince of Wales (later Edward VII) and his pets. A number of his portraits are in the Royal Collection. He exhibited at the Royal Academy from 1866 to 1893. In 1883 he was elected a member of the Royal Institute of Oil Painters.

Barber became a very popular sporting and animal painter, specialising particularly in sentimental portraits of dogs, often with children. His work ranged from photographically realistic to quick sketches. Although some have regarded his work as overly sentimental, his work remains popular, largely because of his competent painting.

Barber received his final commission in 1894 to paint Queen Victoria, with her grandchildren, in her pony-carriage. He died in London soon afterwards. His place as foremost painter of children and pets was taken by Arthur Elsley.

Many of Barber's paintings were made into prints, usually in the medium of photogravure. He exhibited at the Royal Institute of Oil Painters, Walker Art Gallery and  Manchester Art Gallery. Much of his art is at the Lady Lever Art Gallery in Port Sunlight.His world famous prints were then sold in the early 80s in The British home store Woolworths at sale price, soon there after nearly everyone had barbers pictures hanging on their living room walls.

Gallery

Further reading

Furniss, Harry. The Works of Charles Burton Barber (London: Cassell, 1896)

References

External links

Barber online (ArtCyclopedia)
Rehs Galleries, Inc's Bio and image of Off to School
Biography of Barber
Works in the Royal Collection
Biography & Selected Paintings of Charles Burton Barber
Paintings by Barber (Art Renewal Center Museum)
Girl with dogs (Painting at the Lady Lever Art Gallery)
In Disgrace (Painting sold at Christie's in 2007 and biography of Barber)

19th-century English painters
English male painters
English illustrators
English watercolourists
Dog artists
People from Great Yarmouth
1845 births
1894 deaths
19th-century English male artists